Issia Wazi is an Ivorian football club based in Issia, they compete in the Côte d'Ivoire Premier Division.

Current squad

Honours
Côte d'Ivoire Premier Division: 0

Côte d'Ivoire Cup: 1
Winner   : 2005–2006.
Runner-up: 2006–2007

 Coupe Houphouët-Boigny: 0

Performance in CAF competitions
CAF Confederation Cup: 3 appearances
2007 – First Round
2008 – First Round
2010 – Preliminary Round

References

External links
 Article du Matin d'Abidjan
 Football : Issia Wazi, le grand malaise

Football clubs in Ivory Coast
Association football clubs established in 1989
1989 establishments in Ivory Coast
Sports clubs in Ivory Coast
Sport in Sassandra-Marahoué District
Haut-Sassandra